The Warumungu (or Warramunga) language is spoken by the Warumungu people in Australia's Northern Territory.  In addition to spoken language, the Warumungu have a highly developed sign language.

Classification
The Warumungu language is a Pama–Nyungan language similar to the Warlpiri language spoken by the Warlpiri people.

History
In the 1870s, early white explorers described the Warumungu as a flourishing nation. However, by 1915, invasion and reprisal had brought them to the brink of starvation. In 1934, a reserve that had been set aside for the Warumungu in 1892 was revoked in order to clear the way for gold prospecting. By the 1960s, the Warumungu had been entirely removed from their native land.

Current status
Warumungu is classified as a living language, but its number of speakers seemed to be decreasing quickly. In the mid-1950s, Australian linguist Robert Hoogenraad estimated that there were only about 700 people who could speak some Warumungu; by 1983, the population was estimated to be as small as 200 speakers.

However, the language has evidently undergone something of a renaissance. Today, the language is in a robust position compared to many indigenous Australian languages, as it is being acquired by children and used in daily interaction by all generations, and the situation is sustainable though some ethnic group members may prefer Kriol.

Phonology

Consonants 

 Among stops, voicing is always heard in word-initial positions, but tends to devoice in free variation. Voiceless stops are mostly heard as a result of tense stops following liquid or nasal sounds.
 Laminal consonant sounds often fluctuate between lamino-palatal and lamino-dental articulation among speakers.
 Sounds /n, l/ are often heard as pre-stopped [ᵈn, ᵈl] among older speakers, instead of lengthening.
 /ɾ/ can also be heard as a trill [r] in free variation.

Vowels

Syntax and morphology

Warumungu is a suffixing language, in which verbs are formed by adding a tense suffix (although some verbs are formed by compounding a preverb). As are many of the surviving Indigenous Australian languages, the Warumungu language is undergoing rapid change. The morphology used by younger speakers differs significantly than the one used by older speakers. An example of a Warumungu sentence might be , meaning 'father's mother, is she there, in town, or not?'.

External links 
 Paradisec has a number of collections that include Warumungu language materials.

References 

Pama–Nyungan languages